Osburh or Osburga (also Osburga Oslacsdotter) was the first wife of King Æthelwulf of Wessex and mother of King Alfred the Great. Alfred's biographer, Asser, described her as "a most religious woman, noble in character and noble by birth".

Sources
Osburh's existence is known only from Asser's Life of King Alfred. She is not named as witness to any charters, nor is her death reported in the Anglo-Saxon Chronicle. So far as is known, she was the mother of all Æthelwulf's children, his five sons Æthelstan, Æthelbald, Æthelberht, Æthelred and Alfred, and his daughter Æthelswith, wife of King Burgred of Mercia.

Osburh is best known from Asser's story about a book of Saxon songs which she showed to her sons, offering to give the book to whoever could first memorise it, a challenge which Alfred took up and won. This exhibits high-status ninth-century women's interest in books and their role in educating their children.

Osburh was the daughter of Oslac (who is also only known from Asser's Life), King Æthelwulf's pincerna (butler), an important figure in the royal court and household. Oslac is described as a descendant of King Cerdic's Jutish nephews, Stuf and Wihtgar, who conquered the Isle of Wight.

See also
House of Wessex family tree

Notes

References
 Lees, Clare A. & Gillian R. Overing (eds), Double Agents: Women and Clerical Culture in Anglo-Saxon England. University of Pennsylvania Press, Philadelphia, 2001.

External links
 

9th-century deaths
Anglo-Saxon royal consorts
9th-century English people
9th-century English women
Year of birth unknown
House of Wessex